The EPA Federal Test Procedure, commonly known as FTP-75 for the city driving cycle, are a series of tests defined by the US Environmental Protection Agency (EPA) to measure tailpipe emissions and fuel economy of passenger cars (excluding light trucks and heavy-duty vehicles).

The testing was mandated by the Energy Tax Act of 1978 in order to determine the rate of the guzzler tax that applies for the sales of new cars.

The current procedure has been updated in 2008 and includes four tests: city driving (the FTP-75 proper), highway driving (HWFET), aggressive driving (SFTP US06), and optional air conditioning test (SFTP SC03).

City driving

UDDS
The Urban Dynamometer Driving Schedule is a mandated dynamometer test on tailpipe emissions of a car that represents city driving conditions.

It is also known as FTP-72 or LA-4, and it is also used in Sweden as the A10 or CVS (Constant Volume Sampler) cycle and in Australia as the ADR 27 (Australian Design Rules) cycle.

The cycle simulates an urban route of 7.5 mi (12.07 km) with frequent stops. The maximum speed is 56.7 mph (91.2 km/h) and the average speed is 19.6 mph (31.5 km/h).

The cycle has two phases: a "cold start" phase of 505 seconds over a projected distance of 3.59 mi at 25.6 mph average speed, and a "transient phase" of 864 seconds, for a total duration of 1369 seconds.

FTP-75 
The "city" driving program of the EPA Federal Test Procedure is identical to the UDDS plus the first 505 seconds of an additional UDDS cycle.

Then the characteristics of the cycle are:
 Distance travelled: 11.04 miles (17.77 km) 
 Duration: 1874 seconds
 Average speed: 21.2 mph (34.1 km/h)

The procedure is updated by adding the "hot start" cycle that repeats the "cold start" cycle of the beginning of the UDDS cycle. The average speed is thus different but the maximum speed remains the same as in the UDDS. The weighting factors are 0.43 for the cold start and transient phases together and 0.57 for the hot start phase.

Though it was originally created as a reference point for fossil fuelled vehicles, the UDDS and thus the FTP-75, are also used to estimate the range in distance travelled by an electric vehicle in a single charge.

Deceptions
It is alleged that, similarly than in the NEDC, some automakers overinflate tyres, adjusting or disconnecting brakes to reduce friction, and taping cracks between body panels and windows to reduce air resistance, some go as far as removing wing mirrors, to inflate measured fuel economy and lower measured carbon emission.

In addition, it has been brought to attention that the relative height of the simulated wind fan with respect to the vehicle could alter the performance of aftertreatment systems due to changes in temperature and, consequently, modify the pollutant emissions values.

Highway driving

It uses a warmed-up engine and makes no stops, averaging 48 mph (77 km/h) with a top speed of 60 mph (97 km/h) over a  distance.

The following are some characteristic parameters of the cycle:
 Duration: 765 seconds
 Total distance: 10.26 miles (16.45 km)
 Average Speed: 48.3 mph (77.7 km/h)

Before the 5-cycle fuel economy estimates were introduced in 2006 the measurements were adjusted downward by 10% (city) and 22% (highway) to more accurately reflect real-world results.

Supplemental tests

In 2007, the EPA added three new Supplemental Federal Test Procedure (SFTP) tests that combine the current city and highway cycles to reflect real world fuel economy more accurately,. Estimates are available for vehicles back to the 1985 model year.

US06

The US06 Supplemental Federal Test Procedure (SFTP) was developed to address the shortcomings with the FTP-75 test cycle in the representation of aggressive, high speed and/or high acceleration driving behavior, rapid speed fluctuations, and driving behavior following startup.

The engine begins warm and air conditioning is not used.

The cycle represents an 8.01 mile (12.8 km) route with an average speed of 48.4 miles/h (77.9 km/h), maximum speed 80.3 miles/h (129.2 km/h), and a duration of 596 seconds.

SC03

The SC03 Supplemental Federal Test Procedure (SFTP) has been introduced to represent the engine load and emissions associated with the use of air conditioning units in vehicles certified over the FTP-75 test cycle.

Five stops are included, idling occurs 19 percent of the time and acceleration of 5.1 mph/sec is achieved. Engine temperatures begin warm.

The cycle represents a 3.6 mile (5.8 km) route with an average speed of 21.6 miles/h (34.8 km/h), maximum speed 54.8 miles/h (88.2 km/h), and a duration of 596 seconds.

Cold cycle

EPA fuel economy sticker

EPA tests for fuel economy do not include electrical load tests beyond climate control, which may account for some of the discrepancy between EPA and real world fuel-efficiency. A 200 W electrical load can produce a 0.94 mpg (0.4 km/L) reduction in efficiency on the FTP 75 cycle test.

See also
 New European Driving Cycle (until 2018)
 Worldwide Harmonised Light Vehicles Test Procedure
 National Vehicle Fuel and Emissions Laboratory (NVFEL)

References

Standards of the United States